Speed limits in Lebanon, unless otherwise indicated, are:
  in the city
  on rural roads
  on "major highways"

Since November 1, 2010, speed limit enforcement in Lebanon has become more stringent, and the number of tickets issued has dramatically increased.

References 

Lebanon